Bhubaneswar–SMVT Bengaluru Weekly Superfast Express is a Superfast train belonging to East Coast Railway zone that runs between  and Sir M. Visvesvaraya Terminal, Bengaluru in India. It is currently being operated with 12845/12846 train numbers on a weekly basis.

Service

The 12845/Bhubaneswar–Bengaluru Cantt. Superfast Express has an average speed of 49 km/hr and covers 1511 km in 27h 20m. The 12845/Bhubaneswar–Bengaluru Cantt. Superfast Express has an average speed of 56 km/hr and covers 1511 km in 26h 45m.

Route and halts 

The important halts of the train are:

 
 
 
 
 
 
 
 
 
 
 
 
 Sir M. Visvesvaraya Terminal

Coach composition

The train has standard LHB rakes with max speed of 110 kmph. The train consists of 23 coaches:

 2 AC II Tier
 3 AC III Tier
 11 Sleeper coaches
 1 Pantry car
 4 General Unreserved
 2 Seating cum Luggage Rake

Traction

Both trains are hauled by a Visakhapatnam Loco Shed-based WAP-4 electric locomotive from Bhubaneswar to Visakhapatnam. From Visakhapatnam trains are hauled by an Erode Loco Shed-based WAP-4 electric locomotive from Bhubaneswar and vice versa.

Rake sharing

The train shares its rake with 12829/12830 Bhubaneswar–Chennai Central Express.

Direction reversal

The train reverses its direction 1 times:

Schedule

See also 

 Bangalore Cantonment railway station
 Bhubaneswar railway station
 Bhubaneswar–Chennai Central Express

Notes

References

External links 

 12845/Bhubaneswar–Bengaluru Cantt. Superfast Express India Rail Info
 12846/Bengaluru Cantt.–Bhubaneswar Superfast Express India Rail Info

Transport in Bhubaneswar
Transport in Bangalore
Express trains in India
Rail transport in Odisha
Rail transport in Andhra Pradesh
Rail transport in Tamil Nadu
Rail transport in Karnataka